Edward Joseph Adams (born August 24, 1944) is an American prelate of the Roman Catholic Church who has served in the diplomatic service of the Holy See since 1976. He was the apostolic nuncio to Great Britain from 2017 to 2020 and held earlier postings in Greece, Asia, Africa and Central America.

Early life
Adams was born in Philadelphia, Pennsylvania, on August 24, 1944. After his elementary education in Catholic grammar schools, he attended St. Joseph's Preparatory School at Villanova University and St. Charles Borromeo Seminary, both in Philadelphia.

Adams was ordained a priest on May 16, 1970, by Cardinal John Krol.  Adams  graduated from the Pontifical Ecclesiastical Academy in Rome with a degree in canon law in 1976.

Diplomatic service
Adams entered the diplomatic service of the Holy See on March 8, 1976. He held positions in the office of the Secretary of State and in Rwanda, Kenya, Honduras, the Republic of Ireland, Denmark and the Czech Republic.

Adams was appointed apostolic nuncio to Bangladesh and titular archbishop of Scala, on August 24, 1996. He was consecrated on October 23, 1996, in Rome by Cardinal Angelo Sodano, the papal secretary of state. His principal co-consecrators were Cardinal  Anthony Bevilacqua and Cardinal John Foley.

After six years in Bangladesh, Adams was named apostolic nuncio to Zimbabwe on August 22, 2002 On September 3, 2007, he was appointed apostolic nuncio to the Philippines.

On February 22, 2011, Adams was appointed papal nuncio to Greece and on April 8, 2017, he was named to replace Archbishop Antonio Mennini as apostolic nuncio to Great Britain. Adams' title refers to "Great Britain" rather than "United Kingdom" because the nuncio has no role in Northern Ireland, a part of the United Kingdom.  The Catholic Church in Northern Ireland is administered locally, with its apostolic nuncio based in Dublin.

In February 2019, the Guardian reported that Adams received repeated requests for  information to the Independent Inquiry into Child Sexual Abuse (ICSA) held by the British Government. Adams did send a response to the Foreign and Commonwealth Office because he said that was the appropriate channel. On October 5, 2019, an ICSA member was quoted by The Tablet as saying that the Holy See told ICSA that "the domestic laws and internal proceedings of a foreign sovereign entity are not the proper object for a British inquiry".

Pope Francis accepted Adam's resignation as apostolic nuncio to Great Britain on January 31, 2020.

Honours
 Commander of the Order of the Dannebrog, July 23, 1993.
 Grand Cross ('Μεγαλόσταυρος'), Order of the Phoenix (Greece), May 16, 2017.

See also
 List of heads of the diplomatic missions of the Holy See

References

1944 births
Living people
Pontifical Ecclesiastical Academy alumni
21st-century American Roman Catholic titular archbishops
Clergy from Philadelphia
Villanova University alumni
Apostolic Nuncios to Zimbabwe
Apostolic Nuncios to the Philippines
Apostolic Nuncios to Great Britain
Apostolic Nuncios to Bangladesh
Apostolic Nuncios to Greece
20th-century American Roman Catholic titular archbishops